Transformers: Armada was an American comic book published by Dreamwave Productions that ran for 18 issues from July 10, 2002, to December 10, 2003. Originally written by Chris Sarracini, writing duties were taken over by veteran Transformers writer Simon Furman after the fifth issue. The comic was based on the Japanese anime series of the same name by Hasbro and Takara Tomy, but is set in its own continuity with an independent storyline.

Upon its launch, the title was a commercial success, with its first issue being the best-selling comic of July 2002. Sales remained high throughout the first seven issues, with each one scoring in the top 15 of the Diamond Comic Distributors' rankings. However, sales started plummeting after that point and by the end of its run, the title scored out of the top 50.

Transformers: Armada was collected in three trade paperbacks—titled First Contact, Fortress, and Worlds Collide with five, six, and seven issues, respectively—which were published from 2003 to 2004. After IDW Publishing acquired the Transformers licence, the paperbacks were re-released in 2008–2009, and an omnibus collection was published in 2010.

Plot

First Contacts

Fortress

Worlds Collide

Commercial performance
Transformers: Armada #1 was the best-selling comic in July 2002, according to Diamond Comic Distributors' ranking for that month, with around 145,567 copies distributed. High sales continued with #2 being the third best-selling comic of the month. Issue #3 was the first one to sell less than 100,000 copies, while #4 was the first one to not rank in the top 10. Sales continued to plummet from that point on. Issue #8 scored out of the top 20, #10 scored out of the top 30, and by #14 the series failed to rank in the top 50. By the end, Transformers: Armada #18 sold 28,059 copies and ranked 70th in Diamond's rankings.

The series' first trade volume, First Contact, had 2,549 units accounted in Diamond distributed comic shops during its release month, April 2003, placing it 22nd on the trade paperbacks chart. The second trade, Fortress, had 1,952 units accounted in September that same year, and place 37th on the chart, while the third and last trade, Worlds Collide, sold 1,358 units in April 2004, scoring 59th place on the charts. The omnibus published by IDW Publishing in August 2010 sold 707 units and scored 132nd on the list.

Collected editions

Dreamwave Productions

IDW Publishing

References

External links
 Transformers: Armada at the Library of Congress

2002 comics debuts
2003 comics endings
Adventure anime and manga
Dreamwave Productions titles
Mecha anime and manga
Armada
IDW Publishing titles